The Consort beagles campaign was founded in 1996 by British animal rights activists Greg Avery and Heather James, with a view to closing Consort Kennels in Hereford, a commercial breeder of beagles for animal testing laboratories.

Background
The company closed in September 1997 after a ten-month campaign consisting of daily protests and raids carried out by the Animal Liberation Front, including the removal in May 1997 of 26 beagles.

Following the company's closure, the same group of activists set up Save the Hill Grove Cats, Stop Huntingdon Animal Cruelty, and other campaigns that have jointly altered the nature of the animal rights movement in the UK.

Protest
The campaign came to public attention on April 24, 1997 on World Day for Laboratory Animals, when an estimated five hundred protesters turned up for a national demonstration at the kennels located in a field off the A49, between Ross-on-Wye and Hereford.

Activists breached the fence causing it to come down, and a handful of protesters crossed the security area and climbed over the compound wall. The area was then secured by three hundred police officers in riot gear, until two masked men appeared on the single storey building holding a beagle they had removed from the kennels. Following an hour of rioting, the pregnant beagle was lowered to a group of around forty people. The dog was later returned to the kennels by police.

See also
Animal Liberation Front
Camp Beagle
Save the Hillgrove Cats
Stop Huntingdon Animal Cruelty
Save the Newchurch Guinea Pigs
Shamrock Farm
Leaderless resistance

Notes

Animal Liberation Front
Animal rights protests
Animal testing in the United Kingdom
Dog breeding
Dogs in the United Kingdom
Protests in England